The following is a list of international bilateral treaties between Australia and Canada

 Early treaties were extended to Australia and Canada by the British Empire, however they are still generally in force.
 Excludes treaties associated with Commonwealth of Nations agreements.

References

Treaties of Australia
Treaties of Canada